Institut d'études politiques de Bordeaux, also known as Sciences Po Bordeaux, is a French grande école located on the university campus of Pessac, Bordeaux. It is attached to the University of Bordeaux. Established in 1948, Sciences Po Bordeaux is one of the ten Institutes of Political Studies in France.

According to article 2 of an 18 December 1989 decree, the mission of Institutes of Political Studies is : 1° to contribute to the training of higher civil servants as well as executives in the public, para-public and private sectors, notably in the State and decentralized communities 2° to develop the research in political and administrative sciences

Alumni include many notable public figures, including one French Prime Minister, politicians and influential businessmen.

The institute has approximately 1,300 students, admitted after a rigorous selection. Each year, Sciences Po Bordeaux receives about 3000 applications and only around 150 students will be accepted after the selection process, around 5% in average. This process makes it one of the most difficult French Political Institute to be accepted in.

The academic course lasts five years, at the end of which a student graduates with the Diploma of Sciences Po Bordeaux (which is equivalent to a bachelor's degree) and with one of eighteen Masters offered by the institute.

Sciences Po Bordeaux is a well integrated university, with more than 200 exchange-agreements with foreign universities around the world. It also proposes double degree programs with the universities of Stuttgart (Germany), Turin (Italy), Coimbra (Portugal), Madrid (Spain), Hong Kong (China), Moscow (Russia), Kingston (Jamaica) and Quebec (Canada).

History
The school was established by decree on 4 May 1948 under the name "Institut d'études politiques de l’Université de Bordeaux". Maurice Duverger was its first director.  It obtained the status of public establishment and got its present name by decree on 18 January 1969 with the other Sciences-Po of Aix, Grenoble, Lyon, Strasbourg and Toulouse.

The historian and sociologist Jacques Ellul, as well as the future Minister, Secretary of the European Council and Vice-President of the European Parliament, Catherine Lalumière, were teachers in the institution.

Until 1967, Sciences-Po Bordeaux was located in the city center of Bordeaux, before being replaced by the current lower Court of Justice of Bordeaux.

By a decree in 1989, Sciences-Po Bordeaux has been attached to the University of Bordeaux IV. Sciences-Po Bordeaux is a member of the PRES of the University of Bordeaux.

Since September 2016, Yves Déloye is the director of the school.

Directors
 Maurice Duverger
 Marcel Merle
 1967–1977 : Albert Mabileau
 1977–1985 : Claude Emery
 1985–1998 : Pierre Sadran
 1998–2007 : Robert Lafore
 2007–2016 : Vincent Hoffmann-Martinot
 Since 2016 : Yves Déloye

Overview
Sciences Po institutes are Grandes Écoles, a French institution of higher education that is separate from, but parallel and connected to the main framework of the French public university system. Similar to the Ivy League in the United States, Oxbridge in the UK, and C9 League in China, Grandes Écoles are elite academic institutions that admit students through an extremely competitive process. The selection rates at these schools are frequently less than 10%. Alums go on to occupy elite positions within government, administration, and corporate firms in France.

Although these institutes are more expensive than public universities in France, Grandes Écoles typically have much smaller class sizes and student bodies, and many of their programs are taught in English. International internships, study abroad opportunities, and close ties with government and the corporate world are a hallmark of the Grandes Écoles. Many of the top ranked schools in Europe are members of the Conférence des Grandes Écoles (CGE), as are the Sciences Po institutes.

The institute is modeled on the former École Libre des Sciences Politiques, and as such, Sciences Po specializes in political science, but uses an interdisciplinary approach to education that provides student generalists with the high level of grounding in skills that they need in History, Law, Economic Sciences, Sociology, Political science and International relations. The academic course lasts five years, and it is a three-year undergraduate programme and a two-year graduate programme and the primary diploma is a master's degree. The third year of the curriculum is a year of mobility abroad, and students can spend two semesters in a foreign university, one semester in a university and one semester internship or they also have the opportunity to spend two semesters as a trainee. Years 4 and 5 are for specialization. Degrees from Sciences Po are accredited by the Conférence des Grandes Écoles and awarded by the Ministry of National Education (France).

Education 
The academic course, which lasted three years until 2002, was extended to five years following the European model of the "LMD". The year 2005 marked the last phase of the reform.

The second year of the course is a mandatory year of mobility in France or abroad.

Admission 
Entry to Sciences Po Bordeaux is conditioned by selection tests, either at the level of baccalauréat (Bac 0), Bac + 1 (integrated courses) Bac + 3 or master. The selection rate in 2013 for the Bac 0 tests was 6.70%.

 For admission in first year the tests are as follow:
 History essay
 A dissertation on contemporary knowledge
 Language test
 For admission in third year to Bac + 3:
 A dissertation on contemporary knowledge;
 Language test;
 A speciality test to choose between: private law, public law, economics, geography, history, foreign civilization, sociology.

The online registration dates for the events are usually between January and February of each academic year, the entrance exams take place between April and May.
 For admission to the first year, the integrated courses: six of them, are the result of a partnership with a foreign university. Students are sent abroad two out of the 5 years (United Kingdom, Spain, Morocco, Germany, Italy and Portugal). The entry exams consist of a composition essay on a current theme, and a test of living language (English for Morocco). Candidates who are eligible to take part in the written tests must take an oral examination. By 2015, the intake rate for integrated sectors was around 10%.

Social diversification 
Since 2006, with the support of the Regional Council of Aquitaine, the Rectorate of the Academy of Bordeaux and the ACSE, the institute has set up a social diversification program through an integrated preparation system in 24 secondary schools in the region of Aquitaine in order to promote access to the establishment of pupils from less favored social categories. This program, entitled "Sciences Po Bordeaux, I Can Because I Want It!" 1,183 high school students in Aquitaine benefited from this program between 2006 and 2013, 965 has been admitted to the entrance tests and 103 were admitted. Because of this initiative, 30% of its students has received a scholarship of Tertiary Education, highest rate among the 9 Institutes of Political Studies in France.

The First Cycle: The Bachelor of Political Studies 
The first cycle is equivalent to a bachelor's degree in political studies.

The objective of the first cycle is to expose students to disciplines in which they are based on (law, political science, history, economics, international relations, sociology, geography), the acquisition of working methods of Sciences Po and the strengthening two foreign languages besides French.

Each year consists of 60 ECTS credits:

The first year is a year of initial training and acquisition of working methods

The second year consists of a year of compulsory exchange, in the form of a year of study or an internship. Sciences Po Bordeaux has more than 250 academic partner universities in Europe and the rest of the world. Students are also allowed to pursue their studies in France, in a different institution.

The third year is a year of consolidation and orientation to the master's degree.

The Second Cycle: Diploma of the Institute of Political studies 
The Diploma of the Institute of Political Studies is equivalent to a master's degree. The second cycle consists of two years with 60 ETCS per year. Students are required to choose their master, in other word, their specialisation.

During the two years of master, at least one semester is devoted to an internship, which normally lasts for 6 months to prepare students for their future career.

For masters which are research based, an in depth dissertation which lasts for at least 6 months will be required instead of an internship.

There are 4 majors in Sciences Po Bordeaux for the master's degrees and each major consists of different master's degrees as follow:

Major in Public Administration and Management 
Master of Public Administration

Master of Expertise in Public Affairs

Major in International Affairs 
Master of Applied Geoeconomics

Master of International Cooperation and Development

Master of Risk Management in Southern Countries

Master of European Integration and Global Development (in partnership with the University of Moscow)

Master of Politics and Development in Africa and the Countries of the South

Master of International Relations (Also Known as the Bordeaux International Relations Degree which is in English)

Master of International Policy

Master of Interdisciplinary and Inter-University Joint Dynamics of the Afriques (with the University of Bordeaux)

Major in Politics, Society and Communication 
Master of European Affairs

Master of Public Affairs and Interest Representation

Master of Journalism

Master of Public Communication and Policy

Master of Policy Professions

Master of Society, Powers and Representations

Master of Metropolitan strategies and governance

Major in Management of Projects and Organizations 
Master of Management of Enterprises and Organizations

Master of Development of Enterprises of the Social and Solidarity Economy

Master of Management of Cultural Projects and Territorial Development

Master of Governance in the Ecological Transition

Double Degrees 
Sciences Po Bordeaux has set up double degrees with its partners around the globe. Students will obtain a double degree from Sciences Po Bordeaux and the partner institution.

There are six double degrees as follow:

France-Hong Kong, in partnership with the Hong Kong Baptist University

France-Portugal, in partnership with the University of Coimbra

France-Spain, in partnership with the Autonomous University of Madrid

France-Germany, in partnership with the University of Stuttgart

France-Italy, in partnership with the University of Turin

France-Morocco integrated in partnership with the Mundiapolis University of Casablanca.

France – Russia in partnership with People's Friendship of the University of Russia

France – Caribbean Network in partnership with University of West Indies and Guyana of Schoelcher (Martinique) and the University of West Indies of Kingston (Jamaica)

School of Postgraduate studies 
Sciences Po Bordeaux is a member of the Doctoral School "Society, Politics, Public Health". This doctoral school is in cooperation with School of Sciences Sociales: Society, Health and Decision from the University of Bordeaux and the previous doctoral school of Political Science from University of Bordeaux and Institut d'Etudes Politiques, Bordeaux.

This school offers doctorates in:
 Political science
 Sociology

Other courses offered at Sciences Po Bordeaux

The preparation of the French Administrative Examination 
In accordance with its original objective, the IEP contributes to the training of public service executives, both through initial training and through preparations for administrative examinations. There are three specific preparations available for initial training (after the diploma, a bachelor's degree or a master's degree) or in continuing education (employees, civil servants)/
 The General Administration Preparation Center (CPAG) for category A civil service recruitment examination;
These examinations included the National School of Administration, the National Institute of Territorial Studies (INET) and the School of Higher Studies in Public Health (EHESP);
 The preparation for the aggregation and CAPES of economics and social sciences.

Continuing education 
IEP has developed a range of continuing education courses for elected officials, executives of public, parapublic and voluntary organizations as well as corporate executives. These included short courses (1 day) or certifying courses (15 days).

These courses are specialised in IEP's areas of expertise: management, international affairs, territorial governance, social action, communication and management.

The courses are taught by IEP professors and qualified external speakers regarding to the subjects.

Summer thematic School 
In order to diversify its training offer, Bordeaux Political Institute has for several years embarked on a policy of developing a summer thematic schools . These training modules are broadly open to societal issues (in the field of international relations as well as defense and internal political or administrative transformations). They also aim to enhance the social science research produced in the two research units : the Center Émile Durkheim and Les Afriques dans le monde (LAM).

In the recent past, these thematic schools have also strengthened a number of institutional partnerships, notably with the French Association of Political Science, the CNRS or the University of Laval. As a privileged partner of the University of Bordeaux for several years, University of Laval is particularly concerned by two recurrent training modules: the School of International Relations (Hautes Études Internationales / Sciences Po Bordeaux) on "The spirit of democracy" (Department of Political Science, University of Laval/ Sciences Po Bordeaux / Free University of Brussels). As such, these two programs are organized alternately in Bordeaux and in the partner institutions.

This training program, funded in part by Sciences Po Bordeaux, also benefits from the regular support of the IdEx Bordeaux International Summer Schools program, the CNRS Thematic Schools Program and the International Cooperation Fund of the Region new Aquitaine.

Campus 
Before 1967, Sciences Po Bordeaux was based in Bordeaux itself, at No. 4 Rue du Maréchal-Joffre, the present seat of the Court of First Instance of Bordeaux. Since then, it has been located on the University Estate of Talence-Pessac-Gradignan.

From June 2013 to April 2015, the Bordeaux Institute of Political Studies began a complete restructuring of its premises. A total investment of 26 million euros is allocated to this project with 25 million by the Regional Council of Aquitaine and 1 million by the city of Pessac. This work increases the capacity of the school from 1850 to 3000 students and the total area of the building from 8 400 m2 to 15 200 m2 . Four new lecture halls were named after Jacques Ellul, Étienne de La Boétie, Aliénor d'Aquitaine and Simone Veil.

Student's life 
Sciences Po Bordeaux benefits of a vibrant student life.  As in 2013, 34 student socialise were registered by the school. 4 main associations are responsible for the campus life : a student office (BDE) (events, integration camps, graduation ceremony...), Art Association (BDA) (theatre, dance, music, cinema, photography), Erasmix (Erasmus Association) and Sport Association (AS).

Other societies:  a Campus Radio, Podcasts, a wine casting club, entrepreneurship association, newspapers, political groups, cultural exchange clubs, student unions, Think tanks....

Alumni 
A large number of former students have pursued a successful career in politics, senior civil service, media, scientific research or business in France and around the world. Others have played an important role in the fields of Art or Literature.

Politicians
 Bernard Cazeneuve ( Class of 1985 ) (former Prime Minister)
 Damien Abad (Member of Parliament, President of the Ain Departmental Council)
 Florent Boudié (Member of Parliament)
 Pascal Canfin (MEP, former Deputy Minister for Development)
 Fanélie Carrey-Conte (Member of Parliament)
 Paul-Marie Coûteaux (former Member of the European Parliament and President of SIEL)
 François Dagnaud (mayor of the 19th arrondissement of Paris)
 François Deluga (Chairman of the CNFPT, former MP, mayor of Teich)
 Jean Espilondo (former MP, mayor of Anglet)
 David Habib (Member of Parliament)
 Marie Lebec (Member of Parliament)
 David Lisnard (Mayor of Cannes, Vice-President of the General Council of Alpes Maritimes)
 Noël Mamère (former MP, mayor of Begles, ecologist candidate in the 2002 presidential election)
 Marie Recalde (Member of Parliament)
 Laura Slimani (former National President of the Young Socialist Movement, former president of the Young European Socialists)
 Jean Valleix (former Member of Parliament)

Senior civil servants
 Bernard Boucault (former Prefect of Police of Paris)
 Mathieu Gallet (CEO of Radio France)
 Anne Guerin (State Councilor, President of the Bordeaux Administrative Court of Appeal)
 François Rivasseau (Ambassador of the European Union to the United States)
 Mohamed Berrada (Former Ambassador of Morocco in France)
 Bruno Lasserre (State Councilor, vice-president of the French State Council, former President of the Competition Authority)
 François Toujas (Inspector General of Social Affairs, President of the French Blood Establishment)

Business sector
 Christian Blanc (former CEO of Air France and RATP, former member of parliament, former Secretary of State for Development of the Capital Region)
 Bertrand Belinguier (former general manager of GAN and former president of the PMU)
 Éric Ducournau (Chief Executive Officer of Pierre Fabre-Dermocosmetique Laboratories)
 Mathieu Gallet (former CEO of Radio France)
 Nicolas de Tavernost (Chairman of the Board of the M6 television network)
 Jean-Louis Triaud (wine grower and president of FC Girondins de Bordeaux)

Academics
 Hervé Coutau-Bégarie (EdG, CHEM, CSEM, EPHE, ICP)
 Philippe Dessertine (Professor of Economics)

Journalists
 Florent Gautreau (newspaper in France 2)
 Thomas Hugues (journalist at France 5)
 Anne-Sophie Lapix (journalist at France 2)
 Léon Mazzella (journalist and writer)
 Nathalie Renoux (journalist at M6)
 Marie-Hélène Duvignau (journalist for 20 minutes)
 Éric Jean-Jean (host and presenter of radio and TV)
 Mathilde Tournier (journalist at the Dépêche du Midi)
 Martin Weill (journalist at the Petit Journal of Canal Plus, then on TMC in the daily newspaper Quotidien)
 Arnaud Romera (sports journalist at France Télévisions)
 François Trillo (sports reporter for Canal +)
 Eric Besnard (sports journalist at Canal +)

References

External links
 Official site
 Postgrad's site

Buildings and structures in Bordeaux
Educational institutions established in 1948
Bordeaux
Education in Nouvelle-Aquitaine
1948 establishments in France